Sahmabad (also Romanized as Sahmābād; also known as Qal‘eh-ye Salmābād and Salmābād) is a village in Enaj Rural District, Qareh Chay District, Khondab County, Markazi Province, Iran. At the 2006 census, its population was 197, in 50 families.

References 

Populated places in Khondab County